H. indica may refer to:
 Heterorhabditis indica, a nematode species
 Hyophorbe indica, the palmiste poison or palmier bâtard, a flowering plant species
 Hystrix indica, the Indian crested porcupine, an Old World porcupine species

Synonyms 
 Hippoxylon indica, a synonym for Oroxylum indicum, a tree species

See also 
 Indica (disambiguation)